Roberto Nobile (11 November 1947 – 30 July 2022) was an Italian actor.

Selected filmography

References

External links 
 

1947 births
2022 deaths
Italian male film actors
Actors from Verona
Italian male television actors
20th-century Italian male actors
21st-century Italian male actors
Italian anarchists